Paudel is a surname among the Brahmin/bahun families in Nepal, alternative spellings of which include Powdyel, Powdel, Poudal, Poudel, Poudyal, Paudyal, Poudyel, and Powrel. They have gotra as Atrey(आत्रेय) and pravara as Three त्रिप्रवर (आत्रेय, अर्चनाना, श्यावश्व) they are also divided into two sections kalo poudel is considered as brahmins and seto poudel are consideres as Khatris. The “Poudel” dynasty should be conidered as part of the first group (in wich person are divided in Nepal) of the old rich Nepali society.

Notable people bearing the surname include:

Bal Chandra Poudel (born 1961), politician of Nepali Congress
Ananta Prasad Paudel (born 1962), Member of the Second Nepalese Constituent Assembly
Lekhnath Paudyal (1885–1966), poet (author of "A Parrot in a Cage")
Prakash Sharma Poudel, Member of Second Nepalese Constituent Assembly
Purusottam Poudel, former Minister of Nepal
Ram Chandra Poudel, politician belonging to the Nepali Congress
Ranga Nath Poudyal, first Brahmin Prime Minister of Nepal in 1838
Shivahari Poudel, Nepalese actor from Jire Khursani
Usha Poudel, Nepalese dancer and actress
Rohit Kumar Poudel, Nepalese cricketer, the youngest cricketer to hit international half century

Surnames of Nepalese origin
Khas surnames